The Centro-Caspian Dictatorship, also known as the Central-Caspian Dictatorship (Diktatura Tsentrokaspiya) (Azerbaijani: Sentrokaspi Diktaturası), was a short-lived anti-Soviet administration proclaimed in the city of Baku during World War I. Created from an alliance of the Socialist Revolutionary Party and Mensheviks, it replaced the Baku Commune in a bloodless coup d'état on July 26, 1918, and fell on September 15, 1918, when Ottoman-Azeri forces captured Baku.

The Central-Caspian Dictatorship asked for British help in order to stop the advancing Ottoman Islamic Army of the Caucasus that was marching towards Baku. A small British force under General Lionel Dunsterville was sent to Baku and helped the mainly  Dashnak-Armenian forces to defend the capital during the Battle of Baku. However, the Azerbaijani-Ottoman army took Baku over on September 15, 1918, which entered the capital, subsequently causing British forces to evacuate and much of the Armenian population to flee.  After the Ottoman Empire signed the Armistice of Mudros on October 30, 1918, a British occupational force re-entered Baku.

See also 
 Transcaspian Government

References 

1918 in Azerbaijan
Post–Russian Empire states